Penn State Erie, The Behrend College, known as Penn State Behrend, is a public satellite campus of Penn State University and is located just outside Erie, Pennsylvania. It is among the largest of Penn State's commonwealth campuses, with about 4,400 students enrolled in Behrend programs on campus and online. The college offers more than 40 undergraduate majors in four academic schools: The Sam and Irene Black School of Business, the School of Engineering, the School of Humanities and Social Sciences, and the School of Science, which includes the Nursing Program. Behrend also offers five master's degrees, as well as a diverse range of continuing education trainings through its Community and Workforce Programs.

History 
The land that became Penn State Behrend was donated to the university in 1948 by Mary Behrend in memory of her husband, Ernst, co-founder of Hammermill Paper Company. The first class of 146 students enrolled at what was then known as The Behrend Center that same year. 

When the Penn State system was reorganized in 1959, The Behrend Center became the Behrend campus of Penn State. Enrollments and the physical presence of the campus grew quickly in the 1960s and early 1970s. In 1973, the Penn State Board of Trustees granted four-year college and graduate status to Penn State Behrend, making it the first Penn State location outside University Park to achieve such status. 

Today, the college continues to grow, and features an active residential campus, more than $8 million of sponsored faculty research, and more than two dozen outreach initiatives to benefit business and industry, area K-12 students, and the Erie community.

Campus 
Penn State Behrend's sprawling 854-acre campus includes more than fifty buildings, a recognized aboretum, and the scenic Wintergreen Gorge, a six-mile canyon. 

College facilities include the century-old Glenhill Farmhouse, once the summer home of Ernst and Mary Behrend and now home to administrative offices, as well as the recently renovated Federal House, the oldest brick structure in Harborcreek Township, which was expanded in 2022 to serve as the home of the Susan Hirt Hagen Center for Community Outreach, Research, and Evaluation. 

Academic buildings house innovative learning spaces, including:

 An advanced molecular biology lab and biomedical translational research lab, which support Behrend's role as the academic research partner of the Magee-Womens Research Institute in Erie.
 Finance Lab, equipped with Bloomberg Terminals, allowing students to gain experience using the same equipment used on Wall Street.
 James R. Meehl Innovation Commons, a product development and prototyping center staffed by students and open to the community.
 Plastics Processing Lab, a multi-million dollar processing lab, the largest and best equipped undergraduate processing lab in the nation.
 Nursing Simulation Labs, with high-fidelity simulation mannequins that mimic nearly any health emergency.
 Virtual/Augmented Reality Lab, which brings cutting-edge technology to students, the community, and industry partners.

The college is also home to Knowledge Park, a 100-acre research and development complex on campus, with 21 businesses employing 600 people.

The newest building on campus is Erie Hall, a $28.2 million fitness, recreation, and wellness center that replaced the college's original gymnasium.

Academics
 The average class size is 21, and the student-to-faculty ratio is 12:1. The college offers four associate degrees, nearly 40 bachelor's degrees, and five master's degrees, as well as more than 50 minors and certificates.

Penn State Behrend is accredited by the Middle States Commission on Higher Education.

Student life
Penn State Behrend offers more than 140 clubs and organizations on campus, including academic clubs, fraternities and sororities, service organizations, and cultural societies. Larger groups on campus include the Lion Entertainment Board, which is responsible for bringing entertainment to the student population; the Student Government Association; and the Multi-Cultural Council, which coordinates a variety of groups to promote unity.

The Behrend Beacon
The Behrend Beacon is the student newspaper. It is published every Tuesday during the academic school year (with the exception of a Tuesday that may fall during a seasonal break). The primary goal of the Beacon is to be an objective source of local, global, and, most importantly, campus news. The student-run newspaper has a staff made up of multiple positions, under the supervision of the editor-in-chief. To become editor-in-chief, a student must apply and undergo a series of interviews.

BVZ Radio
The college is also home to BVZ Radio ("The Voice Of Behrend"), an online streaming radio station. The station is managed by a student management team. All show programming is produced by students. BVZ often broadcasts live events on the Behrend campus and in the Erie area.

Fraternities and Sororities
Behrend has a Greek life system. There are three college-recognized social fraternities: Delta Chi, Sigma Tau Gamma, and Triangle. There are four college-recognized social sororities: Alpha Sigma Alpha, Alpha Sigma Tau, and Phi Sigma Rho, and Theta Phi Alpha. Delta Sigma Pi, a professional fraternity; Gamma Sigma Sigma, a national service sorority; and Alpha Phi Omega, a national co-ed service fraternity, are also recognized by the college.

On-campus living 
Students living on the Behrend campus have their choice of traditional residence halls or suite-style residences. On-campus apartments are reserved for eligible upper-level students. Special housing options, known as Living Learning Communities, are available for students enrolled in Behrend Honors or Schreyer Honors programs, as well as those in certain majors, such as engineering or nursing, or with certain interests. All residences at Behrend are named after individuals or ships connected to the Battle of Lake Erie.

On-campus dining
There are five on-campus dining facilities:

 Dobbins Dining is the college's main dining hall, serving breakfast, lunch, and dinner, as well as daily specials.
 Bruno's Café is an on-campus café where students can get all types of food and drinks for dine-in or to-go. It is located in the Reed Union Building. There is often live entertainment on weekends.
 Paw's coffee shop offers coffee drinks, pastries, treats, and Penn State Berkey Creamery ice cream.
 The Galley is a convenience store, where students can buy packaged food items and other necessities.
 Clark Café offers a variety of sandwiches, wraps, salads, and drinks.

Athletics 
Penn State Behrend men and women compete as the Behrend Lions in 24 varsity sports. Penn State Behrend is a member of NCAA Division III, the Allegheny Mountain Collegiate Conference and the Eastern College Athletic Conference.

Men's varsity sports
Baseball
Basketball
Cross country
Golf
Soccer
Swimming
Tennis
Track and Field (indoor and outdoor)
Volleyball
Water polo
Wrestling

Women's varsity sports
Basketball
Bowling
Cross country
Golf
Soccer
Softball
Swimming
Tennis
Track and Field (indoor and outdoor)
Volleyball
Water polo

Club sports
Students also participate in five intercollegiate club teams: cheerleading, ice hockey, and men's and women's lacrosse, and rugby. Behrend also has a competitive esports team.

Points of interest
 Arboretum at Penn State Behrend
 Wintergreen Gorge

See also
 Lake Effect

References

External links
 Official website
 Official athletics website

 
 Education in Erie, Pennsylvania
 Universities and colleges in Erie County, Pennsylvania
 Educational institutions established in 1948
1948 establishments in Pennsylvania
 Pennsylvania State University colleges
Behrend